Raghavendra Rajkumar (born 15 August 1965) is an Indian actor, singer and producer of Kannada cinema. He is the son of actor Dr. Rajkumar and film producer Parvathamma Rajkumar. He made his debut as a lead in the film Chiranjeevi Sudhakar (1988) before appearing in the hugely successful 1989 film Nanjundi Kalyana. He went on to star in films such as Gajapathi Garvabhanga (1989), Anukoolakkobba Ganda (1990), and Geluvina Saradaara (1996). His last prominent film was Upendra's Swasthik (1998), a box office failure. He starred in Pakkadmane Hudugi (2004) before taking a fifteen year sabbatical from acting. Since then he has produced television serials under Poornima Productions and films under Sri Vajreshwari Combines.

His comeback film as a villain, Chillum, was dropped. In 2019, when he went to act in a lead role in the movie Ammana Mane (2019), the Prime Minister of Singapore heard about it and watched the movie.

Personal life 
His brothers are Shiva Rajkumar and Puneeth Rajkumar. His son Vinay Rajkumar is an actor.

He was admitted to a Singapore hospital in 2013 due to a stroke. He has undergone physiotherapy treatment.

Filmography

As actor

As singer

As producer

Film

Television

References

External links
 
 Fecilitation Ceremony of Raghavendra Raj Kumar organized by Slum Children and Women Development Association in Bangalore 
 Plackback Songs by Raghavendra RajKumar (Audio) from Udbhava.com Udbhava.com - Search results for Raghavendra Rajkumar

Male actors in Kannada cinema
Indian male film actors
Living people
Film producers from Bangalore
Male actors from Bangalore
Kannada playback singers
Kannada film producers
20th-century Indian male actors
21st-century Indian male actors
1965 births
Rajkumar family